Housing in Pakistan generally consists of three classes: pakka houses (/ pakkā), which are made of strong materials like brick and cement; katchi houses ( kachē), which are made of less-permanent materials such as thatch and bamboo; and semi-pakka houses (these make up, which are a sort of mix of the pakka and katchi houses. Housing in Pakistan has always been insufficient due to a growing population (which reached 224.7 million in May 2011) and accelerated by urbanisation combined with the housing problem being low-priority in the eyes of the government.

Housing shortage and deficit 
Urban areas were facing a shortage of 4.4 million housing units in 2010, while the population is expected to grow by 40 million in 2030. Furthermore, this shortage is expected to grow due to a shortfall of 270,000 housing units per year. In Pakistan, past trends indicate that the increase in housing stock (146 percent increase) lagged far behind the population growth (209 percent increase) during 1960-1998, leading to overcrowding in housing units. The growth of housing in urban areas was far more rapid as compared to rural areas; 253 percent and 115 percent respectively. The habitation density level equals more than three people per room, which is significantly higher than the tolerable crowding level proposed by the United Nations; 1.4 to 2.0 individuals per room. Urban crowding, specifically, has been accelerated by people from less-developed rural areas moving to cities to achieve better qualities of life.

See also 

 Pakistan Islands Development Authority
 Naya Pakistan Housing & Development Authority
 Federal Government Employees Housing Authority

References

POETIC LICENCE: Low-cost cities: an innovative new concept for urban development Daily Times (Sunday, November 24, 2002)
Low-cost housing facility for poors top priority: Governor © 2007 Associated Press of Pakistan
Proposal for the Construction of Low Cost Housing at Ibrahim Hydery, Karachi by Nadir Mansoor et al.

 
Real estate in Pakistan